is a retired Japanese footballer who played as a forward.

Career statistics

Club
.

Notes

References

External links

1996 births
Living people
Sportspeople from Chiba Prefecture
Association football people from Chiba Prefecture
Japanese footballers
Japanese expatriate footballers
Association football forwards
J3 League players
Independiente F.B.C. footballers
VfR Mannheim players
Cherry Orchard F.C. players
Cabinteely F.C. players
Iwate Grulla Morioka players
Expatriate footballers in Paraguay
Japanese expatriate sportspeople in Germany
Expatriate footballers in Germany
Japanese expatriate sportspeople in Ireland
Expatriate association footballers in the Republic of Ireland